The Register of Protected Natural Values of the Republic of Croatia has been created according to the Nature Protection Act (Croatian Zakon o zaštiti prirode) in 2005 (Ch. III/5, OG 70/05 with amendments in 2008, OG 139/08). The register is being administered by the Administration for Nature Protection within the Croatian Ministry of Culture. The register serves as a reference database and unique official data source about protected areas in Croatia. The data in this register is public with the exception of special cases of confidentiality regarding the position of certain protected natural goods. The Nature Protection Act stipulates nine categories of protected areas.

According to the Register, within the Republic of Croatia 461 nature sites are protected in different categories, of which 12 are under preventive protection. The protected areas cover 8.51% of the total surface out of which 11.32% belong to the continental territory and 3.38% to the Croatian maritime area. The largest part of the protected surface are the nature parks (3.71% of the total state territory). Plitvice Lakes National Park is so far the only protected nature area that has also been added to the UNESCO World Heritage.

Constitution
The Croatian constitution stipulates that the protection of natural heritage needs to be regulated according to the constitution and laws of the Republic of Croatia (art. 2).

As regards nature protection, the Croatian constitution stipulates:

Article 3
The protection of nature and the human environment belong among others to the highest values of the constitutional rights of the Republic of Croatia and are a foundation for interpreting the constitution.

Očuvanje prirode i čovjekova okoliša između ostalih najviše su vrednote ustavnog poretka Republike Hrvatske i temelj za tumačenje Ustava.

Furthermore, the constitution stipulates:
Article 52

The sea, the coast and islands, waters, airspace, mining resources and other natural treasures, but also land property, woods, plants and animals, other parts of nature, immovable property and items of particular cultural, historic, economic and ecologic significance, which are of interest for the Republic of Croatia according to law, have its particular protection.

More, morska obala i otoci, vode, zračni prostor, rudno blago i druga prirodna bogatstva, ali i zemljište, šume, biljni i životinjski svijet, drugi dijelovi prirode, nekretnine i stvari od osobitog kulturnoga, povijesnog, gospodarskog i ekološkog značenja, za koje je zakonom određeno da su od interesa za Republiku Hrvatsku, imaju njezinu osobitu zaštitu.

Croatian State Institute for Nature Protection
The Croatian State Institute for Nature Protection (Croatian Državni zavod za zaštitu prirode, DZZP) is the responsible national institution for nature protection. It has been established by governmental decree in 2002 (OG 126/02). According to the Nature Protection Act (Croatian Zakon o zaštiti prirode) the institute is centrally responsible for specialized nature protection activities in Croatia (OG 70/05 and OG 139/08).

Protected area categories
The Nature Protection Act stipulates nine categories of protected areas. The national categories largely correspond to the internationally recognized IUCN protected area categories.

The table below lists the protected area category, the management level and the proclaiming body.

Species
The biodiversity in Croatia is amongst the richest in all of Europe. The reason for this is the specific geographic position of Croatia at the crossing of four biogeographical regions, each of which is characterized by specific ecological, climatic and geomorphological properties. The great diversity of habitats in Croatia has resulted in a wealth of diversity of wild taxa (species and subspecies). Unfortunately, the exact number of wild taxa in Croatia is still unknown. To date, almost 38,000 taxa have been recorded. However, the actual number is estimated to be much higher, with estimates ranging from a minimum of 50,000 to over 100,000.

The Register contains 817 protected and 2,307 strictly protected wild and domesticated taxa. For particularly protected species the Red List of Plants and Animals of the Republic of Croatia has been created. There are more than 100 species that are listed on the European IUCN Red List of endangered species.

See also
Protected areas of Croatia
World Heritage Sites in Croatia

References

External links
Croatian Ministry of Culture (Ministarstvo kulture Republike Hrvatske)
Croatian State Institute for Nature Protection (Državni zavod za zaštitu prirode, DZZP)

Heritage registers in Croatia
Nature conservation in Croatia
2005 establishments in Croatia